Intrasporangiaceae is an actinomycete family. The family is named after the type genus Intrasporangium. The type species of Intrasporangium (I. calvum) was originally thought to form endospores; however, the mycelium of this strain may bear intercalary vesicles that were originally identified as spores. No members of Intrasporangiaceae are known to form spores.

Phylogeny
The currently accepted taxonomy is based on the List of Prokaryotic names with Standing in Nomenclature and the phylogeny is based on whole-genome sequences.

Notes

References

Micrococcales
Actinomycetales
Soil biology